In Brazil, the mayor is the chief executive of the smallest territorial unit — the municipality  — and holds executive powers of the local government, in a "strong mayor-council" arrangement. In Portuguese, the mayor is called the prefeito (if male) or prefeita (if female), while the government itself is termed the prefeitura.

The current system of mayor and council (called the Câmara Municipal) dates from the 1930 revolution and the Vargas era, albeit with changes how elections are conducted. Until 1982, Brazilian mayors were usually elected by the local population, with the exception of state capitals, international border towns, and "national security zones" (which included strategic mining places).

With the end of the military dictatorship and enacting of the 1988 Constitution, all mayors and councillors in the nation are elected every four years. Mayors are elected by a first past the post system in most municipalities—however, if its population is over 200,000, an outright majority is needed to win or the vote will go to a second round runoff election. The most recent election was held in 2020.

The federal capital, Brasília, has no mayor; instead, executive duties are carried out by the Governor of the Federal District.

The insular district of Fernando de Noronha which belongs to the State of Pernambuco doesn't have a mayor, but has an administrator appointed by the Governor, the administrator performs the duties of a mayor during a four-year term, and like Brasília, the district doesn't have municipal elections.

In Brazil, mayors of larger cities, such as Rio de Janeiro and São Paulo, have considerable influence in national politics and are usually potential presidential candidates.

Mayors of Brazilian state capitals as of April 2021 

*Maguito Vilela of the MDB was elected in 2020, but died during his term. Vice-mayor Rogério Cruz thus succeeded him.

**Bruno Covas of the PSDB was elected in 2020, but died during his term. Vice-mayor Ricardo Nunes thus succeeded him.

See also
List of mayors of Rio de Janeiro
List of mayors of São Paulo
  (city council)

References